A three-part referendum was held in Ecuador on 26 November 2006, alongside the run-off for the presidential elections. Voters were asked whether they approved of a ten-year plan for education, plans to improve healthcare provision, and using oil revenues for social and economic programmes. All three proposals were approved by wide margins.

Background
On 10 August 2006 President Alfredo Palacio proposed a referendum with 15 questions. However, this was rejected by the National Assembly, as some proposals involved constitutional changes that required parliamentary approval. On 25 September Palacio issued decree 1871 putting forward three proposals to a referendum. This was approved by the Supreme Electoral Tribunal on 4 October, which also set the date of the referendum.

Proposals

Ten year plan for education
The ten-year plan for education was put forward with eight main policies:
Providing universal education for 0–5 year olds.
Providing universal education from first to tenth grades.
Increasing the number of students studying towards the baccalaureate to at least 75%.
Eradicating illiteracy and strengthening adult education.
Improving the infrastructure and equipment of educational institutions.
Improving the quality and equity of education and implementing a national system of evaluation and social accountability within the education system.
Revaluing the teaching profession and improving the initial training, ongoing training, working conditions and quality of life of teachers.
Ensuring a 0.5% annual increase of education sector's share of GDP until 2012, or to at least 6% of GDP.

Improving healthcare provision
The healthcare proposals would require the National Assembly to approve a law that allocated sufficient financial resources to provide universal health insurance, and an annual increase of 0.5% in the share of GDP spent on healthcare until 2012 (or to a figure of at least 4% of GDP).

Use of oil revenues
The oil revenues proposal would require the National Assembly to pass laws within five months that ensured that any revenues from the oil industry that was not already allocated in the state budget would be used for social investment or revitalising the economy.

Results

Ten year plan for education

Improving healthcare provision

Oil revenues

References

Referendums in Ecuador
2006 in Ecuador
2006 referendums